Chandmal Tarachand Bora College, is an undergraduate and postgraduate, coeducational college situated in Shirur, Pune district, Maharashtra. It was established in the year 1968. The college is affiliated with Pune University.

Departments

Science

Computer Science
Physics
Chemistry
Mathematics
Botany

Arts and Commerce

Marathi
English
Hindi
History
Economics
Psychology
Library and Information Science
Geography
Commerce

Accreditation
The college is  recognized by the University Grants Commission (UGC).

References

External links
http://www.ctboracollege.edu.in

Universities and colleges in Pune
Educational institutions established in 1968
1968 establishments in Maharashtra